Michael Davis (born 21 July 1959) is a Jamaican sprinter. He competed in the men's 4 × 100 metres relay at the 1980 Summer Olympics.

References

1959 births
Living people
Athletes (track and field) at the 1980 Summer Olympics
Jamaican male sprinters
Olympic athletes of Jamaica
Place of birth missing (living people)